Alexander Valentinovich Titov (born 18 July 1957) is a Russian rock musician, known for his role as bassist of the band Aquarium, a position previously held by Fan (Michael Feinstein-Vasiliev). He has also performed with the bands Avgust, Pop-Mekhanika, and Kino. He was born in Leningrad. Alexander Titov is married to British musician and linguist Elena Titov. They have two children, Anna and Catherine.

References

External links 

 

1957 births
Living people
Russian rock musicians
Russian musicians